"All I Wanna Do" is a song written by Brian Higgins, Stuart McLennan, Tim Powell, and Matt Gray for Australian singer Dannii Minogue's third studio album, Girl (1997). The song was produced by Higgins and Gray. "All I Wanna Do" marked a significant change in Minogue's career and image, as did her album Girl from which it was taken. Her image had become highly sexualised, culminating in her nude calendar photo shoot and the suggestive videos and album artwork which accompanied her new releases. This was also the first release on Minogue's new record deal with Warner Bros. Records.

It was released as the first single from Girl on 11 August 1997 and reached the top five in the United Kingdom becoming her first top-five hit. In Australia, the song peaked at number 11, spent 22 weeks in the top 100, and was certified gold, becoming the 78-highest selling-single of 1997 there. "All I Wanna Do" was the first in 13 consecutive Dance Chart number ones for Minogue, stretching between 1997 and 2015 with "Summer of Love". In 2017, the Official Charts Company revealed that "All I Wanna Do" is Minogue's best-selling UK single.

Critical reception
A reviewer from Aberdeen Evening Express stated that "All I Wanna Do" has got "the catchiest chorus around". Quentin Harrison from Albumism described it as a "shimmering, 90s Hi-NRG rocker". British magazine Music Week rated it four out of five, concluding that "three years on from her last single, Dannii sticks to what she does best with this delightfully catchy pop gem which is given an extra lift by powerfully energetic production." Also Chris Finan from the RM Dance Update gave it four out of five, adding that "this is the most credible that Dannii's ever sounded." Sunday Mirror called it "supremely camp", noting it as a "bass-bumping, shuddering return for the more rounded Minogue girl." They added, "Dreamy chorus and banging remixes should see Dannii well out in front." A reviewer from The Sydney Morning Herald wrote that "All I Wanna Do", "with its souped-up production and insanely catchy refrain, is one of the finest pieces of fluff this year. There's nothing else on Girl that touches it for instant satisfaction."

Music video
"All I Wanna Do" features a music video directed by Paul Morgans and was filmed in a studio using green screen technology in 1997. The video marked a significant change in style for Minogue, cultivating a more sexual image of the artist. The video references webcam voyeurism and features Minogue against a Barbie-esque backdrop sensually dancing and engaging with the camera and stroking a white cat. In other scenes, Minogue is riding a Ducati motorcycle and playing a guitar. The video can be seen as a turning point for Minogue, after which she adopted a more sexual and confident persona in her music videos.

The video for "All I Wanna Do" was included on the Australian video collection The Videos in 1998 and the special edition of her greatest hits CD/DVD release The Hits & Beyond in 2006, as well as featuring on her more recent videography retrospective DVD, Dannii Minogue: The Video Collection.

Track listings

 Australian and UK cassette single
 "All I Wanna Do" (radio version) – 4:30
 "All I Wanna Do" (Tiny Tim & The Mekon Dream dub) – 7:43

 Australian and UK CD1, Japanese CD single
 "All I Wanna Do" (radio version) – 4:30
 "All I Wanna Do" (12-inch extended mix) – 6:51
 "All I Wanna Do" (Trouser Enthusiasts' Toys of Desperation mix) – 11:04
 "All I Wanna Do" (Xenomania Dream House mix) – 5:53
 "All I Wanna Do" (D-Bop's Innocent Girl mix) – 7:28
 "All I Wanna Do" (video)

 Australian and UK CD2
 "All I Wanna Do" (radio version) – 4:30
 "All I Wanna Do" (Qattara's mix) – 10:06
 "All I Wanna Do" (Trouser Enthusiasts' Ultra Sensitive dub) – 10:16
 "All I Wanna Do" (Dizzy's mix) – 7:38
 "All I Wanna Do" (Sharp "System" dub) – 7:26

 European CD single
 "All I Wanna Do" (radio version) – 4:30
 "All I Wanna Do" (Xenomania Dream House mix) – 5:53

Charts

Weekly charts

Year-end charts

Certifications

Live performances
Minogue has performed "All I Wanna Do" on numerous occasions, on shows such as BBC's Top of the Pops, as well as live performances at the legendary G.A.Y nightclub in London (both at the Astoria and its now venue Heaven) as well as performing the track during the Sydney Mardi Gras of 1998 and Mushroom Records 25 Year Anniversary Festival in Australia. Minogue also performed "All I Wanna Do" in an a cappella style during her 1998 appearance on the UK show TFI Friday with Chris Evans. In more recent years, Minogue has performed the song at numerous club appearances and most recently in 2015 at the Australian Sydney Gay Lesbian and Transgender Mardi Gras party where she performed the song in a mashup style with "Summer of Love" and as part of her headlining set. The song is considered one of her signature tracks.

All I Wanna Do 2020

Reworked especially for Pride Month 2020, 'All I Wanna Do 2020' features brand new vocals from Dannii, alongside a stirring and dramatic production from Ian Masterson.

Dannii says: "This is a completely new take on All I Wanna Do for 2020 - a year when, globally, we've not been able to hold and touch the ones we love. All I want to do with this track is spread some sparkly cheer for Global Pride 2020. Wherever you are in the world, Pride celebrations this year will be vastly different to what we would have anticipated even six months ago. My hope is we can still connect with one another and create some memories that comfort us and bring smiles".

Producer Ian Masterson says: "I can’t quite believe it’s been 23 years since I did the Trouser Enthusiasts mixes on the original release of 'All I Wanna Do'. It seems our sound has come full circle again and now a new generation of clubbers are discovering pop trance. It was exciting to brush off the cobwebs and get back on the dance floor. Dannii and I have made a lot of music in the intervening years so it’s a joy to return to where we first started out and update this track for 2020".

Dannii will also be releasing a brand new EP of 'All I Wanna Do 2020 – The Remixes', featuring fresh mixes from Trouser Enthusiasts and celebrated singer/songwriter and producer Bright Light, Bright Light. The remix EP will be released on Global Pride day, Saturday 27 June. Bright Light Bright Light says: "Getting to remix one of my favourite songs, by one of my favourite artists, during Pride Month, is absolutely one of the most fun things that's happened to me! I imagined myself on Fire Island drinking cocktails in the sun, and the remix kind of made itself, Dannii's voice is so perfect draped in disco sounds." On 6 August, an additional remix set by Until Dawn was made available.

Formats 
 All I Wanna Do 2020
 "All I Wanna Do 2020" – 3:07

 All I Wanna Do 2020 - The Remixes
 "All I Wanna Do 2020 (Trousers Enthusiasts Club Mix)" – 9:05
 "All I Wanna Do 2020 (Bright Light Bright Light Poolside Disco Mix)" – 5:32
 "All I Wanna Do 2020 (Bright Light Bright Light Poolside Edit)" – 3:24
 "All I Wanna Do 2020 (Trousers Enthusiasts Radio Edit)" – 3:31
 "All I Wanna Do 2020 (Trousers Enthusiasts Dub)" – 7:14

 All I Wanna Do 2020 - Until Dawn Remix
 "All I Wanna Do 2020 (Until Dawn Remix)" – 2:40
 "All I Wanna Do 2020 (Until Dawn Extended Remix)" – 4:25

Personnel
Credits adapted from YouTube.

 Dannii Minogue – lead vocals
 Dorian West – engineer, producer, guitar, keyboards and backing vocals
 Ian Masterson (for Thriller Jill) – producer, programming, additional keyboards and mixing
 Kaylah Attard – backing vocals
 Pizzazzart – single and video artwork

References

External links
 "All I Wanna Do" lyrics — lyrics to the album version of the song.

1997 singles
1997 songs
Dannii Minogue songs
Song recordings produced by Xenomania
Songs written by Brian Higgins (producer)
Songs written by Tim Powell (producer)
Warner Music Group singles